The 1986 United Jersey Bank Classic was a women's tennis tournament played on outdoor hard courts at the Ramapo College in Mahwah, New Jersey in the United States and was part of the 1986 Virginia Slims World Championship Series. It was the ninth edition of the tournament and was held from August 18 through August 24, 1986. First-seeded Steffi Graf won the singles title and earned $29,000 first-prize money.

Finals

Singles
 Steffi Graf defeated  Molly Van Nostrand 7–5, 6–1
 It was Graf's 5th singles title of the year and of her career.

Doubles
 Betsy Nagelsen /   Elizabeth Smylie defeated  Steffi Graf /  Helena Suková 7–6(7–4), 6–3

References

External links
 ITF tournament edition details

United Jersey Bank Classic
WTA New Jersey
United Jersey Bank Classic
United Jersey Bank Classic
United Jersey Bank Classic